The Toyota Verso is a car produced by the Japanese carmaker Toyota between 2009 and 2018. A compact MPV, it served as the direct successor to the Corolla Verso and was available in five- or seven-seat configurations. It was also positioned above the Verso-S/Space Verso in Toyota's European catalogue.

The "Verso" name is taken from the English word "versatility".

Overview 
The Verso was revealed at the 2009 Geneva Motor Show in March 2009. The Verso was marketed in Europe, Morocco, South Africa, China and Israel. It was not marketed in Japan, and not marketed in North America where the similar Matrix was offered instead. In South Africa, the only available diesel engine for the Verso range in South Africa is the 2.0L D-4D.

The facelifted Verso was revealed at the 2012 Paris Motor Show, alongside the E180 Auris. This facelift had the front fascia that is similar to the E180 Auris, and was designed by Mehmet Kiliç of Toyota ED2.

Safety
Euro NCAP test results for 2010 concluded that the Verso was the safest MPV.

Toyota E'Z
The Toyota E'Z is a Chinese built version of the Verso. Produced and marketed by GAC Toyota, it entered production in 2011 and discontinued in 2017.

Sales 

† including the outgoing Corolla Verso

References

External links

Verso
Compact MPVs
Euro NCAP small MPVs
Cars introduced in 2009
Cars of Turkey
Front-wheel-drive vehicles
2010s cars
Vehicles with CVT transmission